The economy of Ethiopia  is a mixed and transition economy with a large public sector. The government of Ethiopia is in the process of privatizing many of the state-owned businesses and moving toward a market economy. The banking, telecommunication and transportation sectors of the economy are dominated by government-owned companies.

Ethiopia has one of the fastest-growing economies in the world and is Africa's second most populous country. Many properties owned by the government during the previous regime have now been privatized or are in the process of privatization and the liberalization of its financial sector in the near future. However, certain sectors such as telecommunications, financial and insurance services, air and land transportation services, and retail, are considered as strategic sectors and are expected to remain under state control for the foreseeable future. Almost 50% of Ethiopia's population is under the age of 18. Even though education enrolment at primary and tertiary level has increased significantly, job creation has not caught up with the increased output from educational institutes. The country must create hundreds of thousands of jobs every year just to keep up with population growth.

History 

Ethiopia's resources have enabled the country—unlike most sub-Saharan African countries—to maintain contacts with the outside world for centuries. Since ancient times, Ethiopian traders exchanged gold, ivory, musk, and wild animal skins for salt and luxury goods, such as silk and velvet. By the late nineteenth century, coffee had become one of Ethiopia's more important cash crops. At that time, most trade flowed along two major trade routes, both of which terminated in the far southwest in the Kefa-Jima region. From there, one route went north to Mitsiwa via Gonder and Adwa, the other along the Awash River valley to Harer and then on to Berbera or Zeila on the Red Sea.

Despite its many riches, Ethiopia would stop being a great trading state after fall of Axum. Most Ethiopians despised traders, preferring instead to emulate the country's legendary warriors and priests. After establishing a foothold in the country, Greek, Armenian, and Arab traders became the economic intermediaries between Ethiopia and the outside world. Arabs also settled in the interior and eventually dominated all commercial activity except petty trade.

When their occupation of Ethiopia ended in 1941, the Italians left behind them a country whose economic structure was much as it had been for centuries. There had been some improvements in communications, particularly in the area of road building, and attempts had been made to establish a few small industries and to introduce commercial farming, particularly in Eritrea, which Italy had occupied since 1890. But these changes were limited. With only a small proportion of the population participating in the money economy, trade consisted mostly of barter. Wage labor was limited, economic units were largely self-sufficient, foreign trade was negligible, and the market for manufactured goods was extremely small.

During the late 1940s and 1950s, much of the economy remained unchanged. The government focused its development efforts on expansion of the bureaucratic structure and ancillary services. Most farmers cultivated small plots of land or herded cattle. Traditional and primitive farming methods provided the population with a subsistence standard of living. In addition, many nomadic peoples raised livestock and followed a life of seasonal movement in drier areas. The agricultural sector grew slightly, and the industrial sector represented a small part of the total economy.

By the early 1950s, Emperor Haile Selassie I (reigned 1930–74) had renewed calls for a transition from a subsistence economy to an agro-industrial economy. To accomplish this task, Ethiopia needed an infrastructure to exploit resources, a material base to improve living conditions, and better health, education, communications, and other services. A key element of the emperor's new economic policy was the adoption of centrally administered development plans.

The First Five-Year Plan (1957–1961) sought to develop a strong infrastructure, particularly in transportation, construction, and communications, to link isolated regions. The Second Five-Year Plan (1962–1967) signaled the start of a 20-year program to change Ethiopia's predominantly agricultural economy to an agro-industrial one. The Third Five-Year Plan (1968–1973) also sought to facilitate Ethiopia's economic well-being by raising manufacturing and agro-industrial performance. However, unlike its predecessors, the third plan expressed the government's willingness to expand educational opportunities and to improve peasant agriculture.

During the First Five-Year Plan, the gross national product (GNP) increased at a 3.2 percent annual rate as opposed to the projected figure of 3.7 percent, and growth in economic sectors such as agriculture, manufacturing, and mining failed to meet the national plan's targets. The Planning Commission never assessed the performance of the Second Five-Year Plan and Third Five-Year Plan, largely because of a shortage of qualified personnel. However, according to data from the Ethiopian government's Central Statistical Authority, during the 1960/61 to 1973/74 period the economy achieved sustained economic growth. Between 1960 and 1970, for example, Ethiopia enjoyed an annual 4.4 percent average growth rate in per capita gross domestic product (GDP). Relative to its neighbors, Ethiopia's economic performance was mixed.

By the early 1970s, Ethiopia's economy not only had started to grow but also had begun to diversify into areas such as manufacturing and services. However, these changes failed to improve the lives of most Ethiopians. About four-fifths of the population were subsistence farmers who lived in poverty because they used most of their meager production to pay taxes, rents, debt payments, and bribes.

The 1974 revolution resulted in the nationalization and restructuring of the Ethiopian economy. After the revolution, the country's economy can be viewed as having gone through four phases. Internal political upheaval, armed conflict, and radical institutional reform marked the 1974-78 period of the revolution. There was little economic growth; instead, the government's nationalization measures and the highly unstable political climate caused economic dislocation in sectors such as agriculture and manufacturing. As a result of these problems, GDP increased at an average annual rate of only 0.4 percent.

In the second phase (1978–1980), the economy began to recover as the government consolidated power and implemented institutional reforms. More important, security conditions improved as internal and external threats subsided. GDP grew at an average annual rate of 5.7 percent.

In the third phase (1980–1985), the economy experienced a setback. Except for Ethiopian fiscal year (EFY) 1982/83, the growth of GDP declined. Manufacturing took a downturn as well, and agriculture reached a crisis stage, particularly due to drought that lead to widespread famine.

In the fourth period (1985–1990), the economy continued to stagnate. GDP and the manufacturing sector also grew during this period, GDP increasing at an average annual rate of 5 percent. However, the lingering effects of the 1984-85 drought undercut these achievements and contributed to the economy's overall stag.

Since 1991, the Ethiopian government has embarked on a program of economic reform, including privatization of state enterprises and rationalization of government regulation. While the process is still ongoing, the reforms have attracted much-needed foreign direct investment.

In 2015, Ethiopia has 2,700 millionaires, a number that has more than doubled since 2007. Their fortunes are mainly built-in niches of economic rents (banks, mines, etc.) without investing in structural and strategic sectors (industrial production, infrastructure, etc.) and should in no way promote economic development or represent a source of competition for Western multinationals.

The Ethiopian government is stepping up its efforts to attract foreign investors, particularly in the textile sector. They can now import their machines without customs duties, benefit from a tax exemption for ten years, rents much lower than market prices, and almost free water and electricity. Major brands have established themselves in the country, such as Decathlon, H&M and Huajian. These companies also benefit from a cheap labor force, with a monthly salary of around 35 euros. Finally, trade agreements between Ethiopia and the European Union allow them to export duty-free.

Sectors

Agriculture, forestry and fishing 

, agriculture accounts for almost 40.5% of GDP, 81 percent of exports, and 85 percent of the labour force. Many other economic activities depend on agriculture, including marketing, processing, and export of agricultural products. Production is overwhelmingly of a subsistence nature, and a large part of commodity exports are provided by the small agricultural cash-crop sector. Principal crops include coffee, pulses (e.g., beans), oilseeds, cereals, potatoes, sugarcane, and vegetables.  Exports are almost entirely agricultural commodities, with coffee as the largest foreign exchange earner, and its flower industry becoming a new source of revenue: for 2005/2006 (the latest year available) Ethiopia's coffee exports represented 0.9% of the world exports, and oilseeds and flowers each representing 0.5%. Ethiopia is Africa's second biggest maize producer. In 2000, Ethiopia's livestock contributed to 19% of total GDP.

, some countries that import most of their food, such as Saudi Arabia, have begun planning the purchase and development of large tracts of arable land in developing countries such as Ethiopia. This land grabbing has raised fears of food being exported to more prosperous countries while the local population faces its own shortage.

Forest products are mainly logs used in construction. The silvicutural properties are used in construction and manufacturing, and as energy sources.

Ethiopia's fisheries are entirely fresh water, as it has no marine coastline. Although total production has been continuously increasing since 2007, the fishing industry is a very small part of the economy. Fishing is predominantly artisanal. In 2014, nearly 45,000 fishermen were employed in the sector with only 30% of them employed full-time.

Ethiopia produced in 2018:

 7.3 million tons of maize (17th largest producer in the world);
 4.9 million tons of sorghum (4th largest producer in the world); 
 4.2 million tons of wheat; 
 2.1 million tons of barley (17th largest producer in the world); 
 1.8 million tons of sweet potato (5th largest producer in the world);
 1.4 million tons of sugar cane;
 1.3 million tons of yam (5th largest producer in the world);
 988 thousand tons of broad bean;
 982 thousand tons of millet;
 743 thousand tons of potato;
 599 thousand tons of vegetable;
 515 thousand tons of chick pea (6th largest producer in the world);
 508 thousand tons of banana;
 470 thousand tons of coffee (6th largest producer in the world);
 446 thousand tons of cabbage;
 374 thousand tons of pea (20th largest producer in the world);
 322 thousand tons of onion;
 301 thousand tons of sesame seed (7th largest producer in the world);
 294 thousand tons of bell pepper;
 172 thousand tons of lentil (11th largest producer in the world);
 144 thousand tons of rice;
 143 thousand tons of peanut;
 140 thousand tons of cotton;
 124 thousand tons of garlic;
 102 thousand tons of mango (including mangosteen and guava);
 101 thousand tons of linseed (7th largest producer in the world);

In addition to smaller productions of other agricultural products.

Textile industry 

Employees of Ethiopian garment factories, who work for brands such as Guess, H&M or Calvin Klein, receive a monthly salary of 26 dollars per month. These very low wages have led to low productivity, frequent strikes and high turnover. Some factories have replaced all their employees on average every 12 months, according to the 2019 report of the Stern Centre for Business and Human Rights at New York University

The report states:" Rather than the docile and cheap labour force promoted in Ethiopia, foreign-based suppliers have met employees who are unhappy with their pay and living conditions and who want to protest more and more by stopping work or even quitting. In their eagerness to create a "made in Ethiopia" brand, the government, global brands and foreign manufacturers did not anticipate that the base salary was simply too low for workers to make a living from. »

Minerals and mining

Energy

Waterpower and forests are Ethiopia's main energy sources. The country derives about 90 percent of its electricity needs from hydropower, which means that electricity generation, as with agriculture, is dependent on abundant rainfall. Present installed capacity is rated at about 2000 megawatts, with planned expansion to 10,000 megawatts. In general, Ethiopians rely on forests for nearly all of their energy and construction needs; the result has been deforestation of much of the highlands during the last three decades. Ethiopia has set out plans to invest $40 billion to 71 energy projects by 2030

Less than one-half of Ethiopia's towns and cities are connected to the national grid. Petroleum requirements are met via imports of refined products, although some oil is being hauled overland from Sudan. Oil exploration in Ethiopia has been underway for decades, ever since Emperor Haile Selassie granted a 50-year concession to SOCONY-Vacuum in September 1945.

Recent oil and gas discoveries across East Africa have seen the region emerge as a new player in the global oil and gas industry. As exciting as the huge gas fields of East Africa are, however, the strong decline in oil prices and expectations for an L-shaped recovery with low prices over the coming years are increasingly challenging the economic viability of the industry in this region.

The discoveries were expected to drive billions of dollars in annual investment to the region over the next decade. According to BMI estimates, the findings in the last few years are more than that of any other region in the world, and the discoveries are expected to continue for the next few years. However, falling global oil prices are threatening the commercial viability of many of these gas prospects.

Manufacturing

A program to privatize state-owned enterprises has been underway since the late 1990s. There has been a large growth of manufacturing in Ethiopia. Several industrial parks have been built with a focus on textiles.

Transport

Prior to the outbreak of the 1998–2000 Eritrean–Ethiopian War, landlocked Ethiopia mainly relied on the seaports of Asseb and Massawa in Eritrea for international trade. , Ethiopia uses the ports of Djibouti, connected to Addis Ababa by the Addis Ababa – Djibouti Railway, and to a lesser extent Port Sudan in Sudan.  In May 2005, the Ethiopian government began negotiations to use the port of Berbera in Somaliland. By 2030, the government expects a $74 billion investment in transportation

Road 
As of 2016, there are  all-weather roads.

Air 
Ethiopian Airlines, is Africa's largest and most profitable airline. It serves 132 destinations and has a fleet size of 141 aircraft.

Rail 
The Ethiopian railway network has been rapidly expanding. In 2015, the first light rail in Africa was opening in Addis Ababa. In 2017, the electric Addis Ababa-Djibouti railway began operations. Presently, two other electric railways are under construction: Awash-Woldiya and Woldiya-Mekelle.

Telecommunications and technology

Telecommunications are provided by a state-owned monopoly, Ethio Telecom, formerly the Ethiopian Telecommunications Corporation.

In 2020, ministers set out a national transformation strategy called Digital Ethiopia 2025. Its aim is to prepare the country for the development of an economy based on digital technology.

Tourism

Aside from wholesale and retail trade, transportation, and communications, the services sector consists almost entirely of tourism. Developed in the 1960s, tourism declined greatly during the later 1970s and the 1980s under the military government. Recovery began in the 1990s, but growth has been constrained by the lack of suitable hotels and other infrastructure, despite a boom in construction of small and medium-sized hotels and restaurants, and by the impact of drought, the 1998–2000 war with Eritrea, and the specter of terrorism. In 2002 more than 156,000 tourists entered the country, many of them Ethiopians visiting from abroad, spending more than US$77 million. In 2008, the number of tourists entering the country had increased to 330,000. A decade later, in 2019, Ethiopia registered a record of 812,000 tourists visiting the country, bringing a revenue of $3.55 bn (4.2 percent of the gross national product).

Macroeconomic trends

The following table displays the trend of Ethiopia's gross domestic product at market prices, according to estimates by the International Monetary Fund with figures in millions of Ethiopian Birr.

The current GDP (USD) per capita of Ethiopia shrank by 43% in the 1990s. The economy saw continuous real GDP growth of at least 5% since 2004.

The following table shows the main economic indicators in 1980–2017. Inflation below 5% is in green.

Ethiopia's economy experienced strong, broad-based growth averaging 9.4% a year from 2010/11 to 2019/20, Ethiopia's real gross domestic product (GDP) growth slowed down to 6.1% in 2019/20 due to the COVID-19 pandemic). Industry, mainly construction, and services accounted for most of the growth. Agriculture was not affected by the COVID-19 pandemic and its contribution to growth slightly improved in 2019/20 compared to the previous year. Private consumption and public investment explain demand-side growth, the latter assuming an increasingly important role.

Poverty

External trade

Until 2013, the major agricultural export crop was coffee, providing about 26.4% of Ethiopia's foreign exchange earnings. In the beginning of 2014, oilseeds exports have been more important. Coffee is critical to the Ethiopian economy. More than 15 million people (25% of the population) derive their livelihood from the coffee sector.

Other exports include live animals, leather and leather products, chemicals, gold, pulses, oilseeds, flowers, fruits and vegetables and khat (or qat), a leafy shrub which has psychotropic qualities when chewed. Cross-border trade by pastoralists is often informal and beyond state control and regulation. In East Africa, over 95% of cross-border trade is through unofficial channels and the unofficial trade of live cattle, camels, sheep and goats from Ethiopia sold to Somalia, Kenya and Djibouti generates an estimated total value of between US$250 and US$300 million annually (100 times more than the official figure). This trade helps lower food prices, increase food security, relieve border tensions and promote regional integration. However, there are also risks as the unregulated and undocumented nature of this trade runs risks, such as allowing disease to spread more easily throughout the region. Furthermore, the government of Ethiopia is purportedly unhappy with lost tax revenue and foreign exchange revenues. Recent initiatives have sought to document and regulate this trade.

Dependent on a few vulnerable crops for its foreign exchange earnings and reliant on imported oil, Ethiopia lacks sufficient foreign exchange. The financially conservative government has taken measures to solve this problem, including stringent import controls and sharply reduced subsidies on retail gasoline prices. Nevertheless, the largely subsistence economy is incapable of supporting high military expenditures, drought relief, an ambitious development plan, and indispensable imports such as oil; it therefore depends on foreign assistance.

In December 1999, Ethiopia signed a $1.4 billion joint venture deal with the Malaysian oil company, Petronas, to develop a huge natural gas field in the Somali Region. By the year 2010, however, implementation failed to progress and Petronas lost its license to develop the field, which is now being invested in by Chinese company, Poly-GCL Petroleum. 
Ethiopia has already begun exporting electricity to Kenya, South Sudan and Djibouti. Earning from this has generated US$300 million annually. After the completion of the Grand Ethiopian Renaissance Dam (GERD) total generation of exports to neighboring countries is expected to bring in us$1 billion annually to the economy.
The dam will be the largest hydroelectric power plant in Africa when completed, as well as among the 20 largest in the world.

See also

Foreign aid to Ethiopia
Famines in Ethiopia
Growth and Transformation Plan
List of companies of Ethiopia
Special economic zone
Trade unions in Ethiopia
United Nations Economic Commission for Africa

References

Works cited

Further reading 
 Fantu Cheru, Christopher Cramer, and Arkebe Oqubay (eds.). 2019. The Oxford Handbook of the Ethiopian Economy. Oxford University Press.

External links
 
 Addis Fortune, an online economics and finance journal
 Ethiopia latest trade data on ITC Trade Map
 National Bank of Ethiopia: History of banking in Ethiopia
 World Bank Ethiopia Summary Trade Statistics

 
Economics in developing countries
Ethiopia